Time is the seventh studio album by Japanese boy band Arashi. The album was released on July 11, 2007, in Japan under their record label J Storm in two editions: a limited 2CD version and a regular CD version. The album was released digitally on February 7, 2020.

Content
The regular edition contains a bonus track while the limited edition includes a second CD containing a solo song from each of the members of the group, the first time since the release of the album One in 2005. The album contains the singles "Aozora Pedal", "Love So Sweet" (the theme song to the Japanese television drama Hana Yori Dango 2) and "We Can Make It!" (the theme song to the drama Bambino!).

Commercial performance
With first week sales of about 191,000 copies sold, the album went on to sell a total of 296,231 copies by the end of the year, making it the 41st best-selling album of 2007.

Track listing

Charts

Weekly charts

Year-end charts

Certifications

Release history

References

External links
Time 

Arashi albums
2007 albums
J Storm albums